Ghulam Mohammad Baksh Butt (22 May 1878 – 23 May 1960), commonly known as Rustam-e-Hind (Hindustani for Rostam of Hindostan) and by the ring name The Great Gama, was a pehlwani wrestler and strongman in British India. In the early 20th century, he was an undefeated wrestling champion of British India.

Born in the village of Jabbowal, Amritsar District in the Punjab Province of British India in 1878, Baksh was awarded a version of the World Heavyweight Championship on 15 October 1910. Undefeated in a career spanning more than 52 years, he is considered one of the greatest Indian wrestlers of all time. After the partition of British India, into the Dominion of India and the Dominion of Pakistan in August 1947, Gama migrated to Pakistan, where he died in the city of Lahore on 23 May 1960.

Early life

Ghulam Mohammad Baksh was born on 22 May 1878 in Jabbowal Village, Amritsar district, Punjab Province, British India (now Jabbowal, Kapurthala District, Punjab, India) into a Punjabi speaking Kashmiri family of wrestlers. 

He was first noticed at the age of ten, in 1888, when he entered a strongman competition held in Jodhpur, which included many gruelling exercises such as squats. The contest was attended by more than four hundred wrestlers and Gama was among the last fifteen and was named the winner by the Maharaja of Jodhpur due to his young age. Gama was subsequently taken into training by the Maharaja of Datia.

Career

First encounter with Raheem Bakhsh Sultaniwala
In 1895, at the age of 17, Gama challenged then-Indian Wrestling Champion, middle-aged Raheem Bakhsh Sultani Wala, another ethnic Kashmiri wrestler from Gujranwala, Punjab Province, Colonial India (now in Pakistan). Raheem's only drawback was his age as he was much older than Gama, and near the end of his career. The bout continued for hours and eventually ended in a draw. The contest with Raheem was the turning point in Gama's career. After that, he was looked upon as the next contender for the title of Rustam-e-Hind or the Indian Wrestling Championship. In the first bout Gama remained defensive, but in the second bout he went on the offensive. Despite severe bleeding from his nose and ears, he managed to deal a great deal of damage to Raheem Bakhsh.

By 1910, Gama had defeated all the prominent Indian wrestlers who faced him except Raheem. At this time, he focused his attention on the rest of the world. Accompanied by his younger brother Imam Bakhsh, Gama sailed to England to compete with the Western wrestlers but could not gain instant entry, because of his lower height.

Tournament in London
In London, Gama issued a challenge that he could throw any three wrestlers in thirty minutes of any weight class. This announcement however was seen as a bluff by the wrestlers and their wrestling promoter R. B. Benjamin. For a long time no one came forward to accept the challenge. To break the ice, Gama presented another challenge to specific heavy weight wrestlers. He challenged Stanislaus Zbyszko and Frank Gotch, either he would beat them or pay them the prize money and go home. The first professional wrestler to take his challenge was the American Benjamin Roller. In the bout, Gama pinned Roller in 1 minute 40 seconds the first time, and in 9 minutes 10 seconds the other. On the second day, he defeated 12 wrestlers and thus gained entry to the official tournament.

Match with Stanislaus Zbyszko
He was pitted against world champion Stanislaus Zbyszko and the bout was set for 10 September 1910. Zbyszko was then regarded among the premier wrestlers in the world; and he would then take on the mammoth challenge of India's feared Great Gama, an undefeated champion who had been unsuccessful in his attempts to lure Frank Gotch into a match. And so, on 10 September 1910, Zbyszko faced the Great Gama in the finals of the John Bull World Championships in London. The match was worth £250 in prize money and the John Bull Belt. Within a minute, Zbyszko was taken down and remained in that position for the remaining 2 hours and 35 minutes of the match. There were a few brief moments when Zbyszko would get up, but he just ended back down in his previous position. Through this defensive strategy of hugging the mat in order to nullify Great Gama's greatest strengths, Zbyszko wrestled the Indian legend to a draw after nearly three hours of grappling, though Zbyszko's lack of tenacity angered many of the fans in attendance.

Nevertheless, Zbyszko still became one of the few wrestlers to ever meet the Great Gama without going down in defeat; The two men were set to face each other again on 17 September 1910. On that date, Zbyszko failed to show up and Gama was announced the winner by default. He was awarded the prize and the John Bull Belt. Receiving this belt entitled Gama to be called Rustam-e-Zamana or World Champion but not the lineal champion of the world as he hadn't defeated Zbyszko in the ring.

Bouts against American and European champions
During this tour Gama defeated some of the most respected grapplers in the world, "Doc" Benjamin Roller of the United States, Maurice Deriaz of Switzerland, Johann Lemm (the European Champion) of Switzerland, and Jesse Peterson (World Champion) from Sweden. In the match against Roller, Gama threw "Doc" 13 times in the 15-minute match. Gama now issued a challenge to the rest of those who laid claim to the World Champion's Title, including Japanese Judo champion Taro Miyake, George Hackenschmidt of Russia and Frank Gotch of the United States – each declined his invitation to enter the ring to face him. At one point, to face some type of competition, Gama offered to fight twenty English wrestlers, one after another. He announced that he would defeat all of them or pay out prize money, but still no one would take up his challenge.

Final encounter with Raheem Bakhsh Sultani Wala

Shortly after his return from England, Gama faced Raheem Bakhsh Sultani Wala in Allahabad. This bout eventually ended the long struggle between the two pillars of Indian wrestling of that time in favour of Gama and he won the title of Rustam-e-Hind or the lineal Champion of India. Later in his life when asked about who was his strongest opponent, Gama replied, "Raheem Bakhsh Sultani Wala".

Rematch with Zbyszko

After beating Raheem Bakhsh Sultani Wala, Gama faced Pandit Biddu, who was one of the best wrestlers in India of that time (1916), and beat him.

In 1922, during a visit to India, the Prince of Wales presented Gama with a silver mace.

Gama did not have any opponents until 1927, when it was announced that Gama and Zbyszko would face each other again. They met in Patiala in January 1928. Entering the bout, Zbyszko "showed a strong build of body and muscle" and Gama, it was reported "looked much thinner than usual". However, he managed to overpower the former easily and won the bout inside a minute, winning the Indian version of the lineal World Wrestling Championship. Following the bout, Zbyszko praised him, calling him a "tiger".

At forty-eight years old he was now known as the "great wrestler" of India.

After defeating Zbyszko, Gama beat Jesse Petersen in February 1929. The bout lasted only one and a half minutes. This was the last bout that Gama fought during his career.

Final years
After the partition of India in 1947, Gama moved to Pakistan. During the Hindu-Muslim riots that broke out at the time of partition, Gama (a Muslim) saved hundreds of Hindus from mobs in Lahore. Although Gama did not retire until 1952, he failed to find any other opponents. Some other sources say he wrestled until 1955. After his retirement, he trained his nephew Bholu Pahalwan, who held the Pakistani wrestling championship for almost 20 years.

His final days were difficult; he had five sons and four daughters and all the sons died young. When his youngest son Jalaluddin died in 1945 at the age of just thirteen, Gama was heartbroken and lost the power of speech for some days. He migrated to Pakistan at partition and tried his hand at different unsuccessful ventures including a bus service in Karachi called the "Gama Transport Service". Gama was given land and monthly pension by the government and supported his medical expenses until his death. He died in Lahore, Pakistan on 23 May 1960 after a period of illness.

Kulsoom Nawaz, politician and wife of former Pakistani Prime Minister Nawaz Sharif, was the granddaughter of Gama.

Legacy
Gama fought and won over five thousand matches. Bruce Lee was an avid follower of Gama's training routine. Lee read articles about Gama and how he employed his exercises to build his legendary strength for wrestling, and Lee quickly incorporated them into his own routine. The training routines Lee used included "the cat stretch", and "the squat" (known as "baithak", and also known as the "deep-knee bend.").

Today, a doughnut-shaped exercise disc called Hasli weighing 100 kg, used by him for squats and pushups, is housed at the National Institute of Sports (NIS) Museum at Patiala, India.

On 22 May 2022, search engine Google commemorated Gama with a Doodle on his 144th birth anniversary. Google commented: "Gama’s legacy continues to inspire modern day fighters. Even Bruce Lee is a known admirer and incorporates aspects of Gama's conditioning into his own training routine!"

Championships and accomplishments
International Professional Wrestling Hall of Fame
Class of 2021
George Tragos/Lou Thesz Professional Wrestling Hall of Fame
 Class of 2007
Professional Wrestling Hall of Fame and Museum
 Class of 2015

References

External links
The Lion of the Punjab – Gama in England, 1910 by Graham Noble
Subaltern Bodies and Nationalist Physiques: Gama the Great and the Heroics of Indian Wrestling by Joseph Alter, Department of Anthropology at the University of Pittsburgh, Pennsylvania

1878 births
1960 deaths
People associated with physical culture
People from Datia
Punjabi people
Indian people of Kashmiri descent
Indian male professional wrestlers
Indian bodybuilders
Pakistani professional wrestlers
Pakistani bodybuilders
Recipients of the Pride of Performance
Sportspeople from Amritsar
Sportspeople from Lahore
20th-century professional wrestlers
People from Lahore
Sportspeople from British India